Neil McNeil Colville (August 4, 1914 – December 26, 1987) was a professional ice hockey player. Born in Edmonton, Alberta, he played for the New York Rangers in the National Hockey League with his brother Mac, winning the Stanley Cup in 1940.

Playing career
Colville joined the Rangers' farm team in 1934 and quickly made his way to the pros by 1936, centreing the "Bread Line" with his brother and Alex Shibicky, where he played until World War II. During the war, he and his brother were stationed in Ottawa and played on the army's Ottawa Commandos team, winning the Allan Cup in 1942.

After the war, they both returned the Rangers, this time as defencemen, the first pairs of brothers to ever do so in the NHL. Neil was adept at both defence and offense, and was the second player to be named to All-Star Teams as both a forward and a defenseman, behind Dit Clapper.

He retired in 1949 and became the Rangers' youngest coach a year later, but he was forced to resign due to health problems halfway through his second season.

Post-playing career
In the 1950s, Colville was one of the primary founding investors in what would become Northern Television Systems, WHTV, in Whitehorse, Yukon, Canada. Colville eventually moved from Vancouver, B.C. to Whitehorse in order to run the small four-channel station alongside Bert Wybrew. He slept in a bunk in the studio and learned to do everything from fixing the equipment to hosting the news casts. Filling the air time without the benefit of extensive broadcasting infrastructure was at times difficult, and the station would run footage of downtown's Main Street or do live broadcasts of a goldfish bowl to fill the hours.
    
He was inducted into the Hockey Hall of Fame in 1967. He died in 1987 and there is a memorial bench in his honor at the Gary Point Park in Steveston, British Columbia.

In the 2009 book 100 Ranger Greats, the authors ranked Colville at No. 22 all-time of the 901 New York Rangers who had played during the team's first 82 seasons.

Career statistics

Regular season and playoffs

Coaching record

See also
List of NHL players who spent their entire career with one franchise

References

External links
 

1914 births
1987 deaths
Canadian Army personnel
Canadian military personnel from Alberta
Canadian ice hockey centres
Canadian Army personnel of World War II
Hockey Hall of Fame inductees
New Haven Ramblers players
New York Crescents players
New York Rangers players
Ottawa Senators (QSHL) players
Philadelphia Ramblers players
Quebec Aces (QSHL) players
Ice hockey people from Edmonton
Stanley Cup champions